Harvey Leslie Hyde (born July 13, 1939) is an American sports journalist and former football coach.  He served as the head football coach at the University of Nevada, Las Vegas (UNLV) from 1982 to 1985.

Early career
Hyde was born in Pasadena, California. He started his college head coaching career at Pasadena City College. He graduated from the University of Redlands.

Coaching career
The Rebels improved under Hyde's tenure. In 1983, they went 7–4, a four win improvement from the last season. The following year, they had unprecedented success in the 1984 season; with star quarterback Randall Cunningham, UNLV went 11–2, won their conference title and defeated Toledo in the California Bowl. It was UNLV's only 11-win season.  Hyde was at one point a candidate for the vacant head coaching position at Arizona State.

However, it was later discovered the Rebels had used ineligible players and the Pacific Coast Athletic Association (now Big West Conference) had the Rebels forfeit all the wins from the 1983 and 1984 seasons, though the wins were not stricken from NCAA and UNLV records.  Although none of the ineligible players were used in the bowl game, the California Bowl was among the games forfeited.  The issue erupted at the same time the university president, Robert Maxson, was in the middle of an hostile relationship with the school's famous head basketball coach, Jerry Tarkanian, over similar off-the-court issues with players. The athletic director at the time, Brad Rothermel, noted in later years that Maxson wanted to fire Hyde because of the coach's friendship with Jerry Tarkanian's brother, Myron, stating "When President Maxson discovered (that friendship), he did what he could to level the legs of the football program. We didn't recover from that."  During the 1985 season, one of Hyde's players was Marion "Suge" Knight.  Among his coaching staff was future Fresno State head coach Pat Hill.

Things became more difficult for the embattled coach, as nine of his players got involved in various scrapes with the law ranging from theft to assault. Finally, on April 23, 1986, Hyde was fired by Maxon with three years left on his $62,500-a-year contract, which the university said it would honor. One of his assistant coaches, Wayne Nunnely, was named interim head coach through the 1986 season, before being chosen as his permanent successor. His firing marked a period of decline for the Rebels that lasted for over three decades.

Hyde coached football one last time in 1990, as George Allen's associate head coach, recruiting coordinator and running backs coach at Long Beach State.  During that year, Hyde recruited future National Football League star Terrell Davis.  Their tenure would only last one season as Allen died just after the end of the regular season, in part due to weak health after his players drenched him with ice water to celebrate a season-ending victory over UNLV.  In interviewing to be the permanent head coach of Long Beach State, a program which was under financial duress, Hyde offered radical ideas of having the team play only road games, recruit only junior college players and use only one set of uniforms; he was not selected and the program only lasted one more season before finally shutting down.

After coaching
After football, Hyde went on to do sports radio for KSHP-AM 1400 in Las Vegas, and working as part of the USC football pregame show for ESPN Radio 710 in Los Angeles.

Head coaching record

* Entire 1983 and 1984 seasons, including the 1984 California Bowl, forfeited due to ineligible players. On-field record for 1983 is 7–4 (4–2 PCAA), official record for 1984 is 11–2 (7–0 PCAA).
#On-field record is 26–19–1 (16–9–1 PCAA) if forfeited games are included.

References

1939 births
Living people
Long Beach State 49ers football coaches
Pasadena City Lancers football coaches
Sportspeople from Pasadena, California
University of Redlands alumni
UNLV Rebels football coaches